The Aurora Hotel is a historic hotel building at 652-660 Main Street in Worcester, Massachusetts.  The six story Classical Revival building was built in 1898 for Charles Stevens, son of a Worcester businessman, who was a lawyer and major landowner in the city.  It features decorative carved stone panels, bay windows with pressed metal ornamentation, and a pressed metal cornice.

The building was listed on the National Register of Historic Places in 1988.  It has since been converted to apartments.

Aurora Gallery
The Aurora Gallery is a contemporary art gallery operated by ArtsWorcester in the Aurora Hotel.

See also
National Register of Historic Places listings in southwestern Worcester, Massachusetts
National Register of Historic Places listings in Worcester County, Massachusetts

References

External links
 Aurora Gallery - ArtsWorcester

Hotel buildings on the National Register of Historic Places in Massachusetts
Neoclassical architecture in Massachusetts
Hotel buildings completed in 1897
Buildings and structures in Worcester, Massachusetts
National Register of Historic Places in Worcester, Massachusetts